HMS Mallard was a  sloop of the British Royal Navy. Completed in 1936, Mallard served through the Second World War, carrying out convoy escort operations off the east coast of the British Isles. She was sold for scrap in 1947.

Construction and design
HMS Mallard was one of two  sloops ordered by the British Admiralty on 21 March 1935. The Kingfishers were intended as coastal escorts, suitable for replacing the old ships used for fishery protection and anti-submarine warfare training in peacetime, while being suitable for mass production in wartime. Displacement was  standard and  full load.

Main gun armament was a single QF 4-inch (102 mm) Mk V gun on a low angle mount. This was considered adequate for dealing with a surfaced submarine. Eight Lewis guns comprised the ship's anti-aircraft armament. Anti-submarine armament was relatively heavy for the time, with a load of 40 depth charges, launched by two depth charge throwers and two depth charge chutes, with Type 124 sonar fitted in a retracting dome. The ship had a crew of 60 officers and men.

Mallard was laid down at Alexander Stephen and Sons' Linthouse, Glasgow shipyard on 12 June 1935, was launched on 26 March 1936, and commissioned at Devonport on 15 July 1936.

Service
In 1939 Mallard was based at Portland Harbour as part of the 1st Anti-Submarine Flotilla,   On 9 August 1939, the ship took part in a review of the Reserve Fleet at Weymouth by King George VI. On the outbreak of the Second World War in September 1939, she joined Western Approaches Command, operating out of Milford Haven, but soon transferred to the Nore Command for operations out of Dover. In November 1939, Mallard joined the First Anti-Submarine Striking Force, based in Belfast, and on 4 December she made an unsuccessful attack on a suspected German submarine in Liverpool Bay.

In January 1940, the First Anti-Submarine Striking Force, including Mallard, transferred to Harwich, carrying out anti-submarine patrols in the North Sea. On 6 March she was attacked unsuccessfully by a German bomber, but the next day she was damaged in a collision of Harwich, and was under repair in London until 27 April. The attempt failed, with one blockship running aground and the other being scuttled in the wrong place, and so was repeated on the night of 26/27 May, again with Mallard as part of the escort. Operation Dynamo, the evacuation of British and Allied troops from Dunkirk had begun on 26 May, and on 28 May Mallard carried out anti-submarine patrols in support of the evacuation. She again operated off Dunkirk on 1–2 May, escorting the anti-aircraft cruiser .

She became increasingly involved in escorting convoys on Britain's east coast, and on 3 August rescued the survivors from the merchant ship  which had been sunk by a mine. On 30 September she was attacked by a low-flying bomber near the Kentish Knock lightship, with two bombs near missing her and one striking the ship's engine room, knocking out Mallards engines and causing heavy flooding. She was out of action for nine months following this attack.

On 15 September 1941, the tanker  struck a mine off East Anglia and broke in two. The bow section of the ship sank, while the stern section stayed afloat and was towed to Great Yarmouth for repair with Mallard acting as escort. On 7 December 1941, the cargo ship  was sunk by a mine off Spurn Point. Mallard rescued all 49 of Welsh Princes crew. On 12 May 1943 Mallard claimed a German Dornier bomber shot down. On the night of 14/15 February 1944 Mallard and sister ship  engaged and pursued six E-boats that had laid mines off Great Yarmouth.

Mallard remained in full service, operating on patrols in the North Sea through the rest of the war in Europe, going into reserve at Harwich in June 1945. She was sold for scrap on 21 April 1947.

Pennant numbers

References

Citations

Bibliography

Further reading
 
 
 

Kingfisher-class sloops
1936 ships